Griže is the name of several places in Slovenia:

 Griže, Ivančna Gorica
 Griže, Sežana
 Griže, Žalec